Aleksei Churkin (born 2 July 1998) is a Russian para-athlete who specializes in shot put. He represented Russian Paralympic Committee athletes at the 2020 Summer Paralympics.

Career
Churkin represented Russian Paralympic Committee athletes at the 2020 Summer Paralympics in the shot put F32 event and won a silver medal.

References

1998 births
Living people
Russian male shot putters
Paralympic athletes of Russia
Medalists at the World Para Athletics European Championships
Athletes (track and field) at the 2020 Summer Paralympics
Medalists at the 2020 Summer Paralympics
Paralympic silver medalists for the Russian Paralympic Committee athletes
21st-century Russian people